The 2020 W-League grand final was the final match of the 2019–20 W-League season to decide the champions of women's soccer in Australia for the season.

The match was played between Melbourne City and Sydney FC behind closed doors at AAMI Park in Melbourne, Victoria. Spectators were not permitted at the match due to the COVID-19 pandemic. 

Melbourne City won the match and in so doing claimed their fourth W-League championship, the most of any club in the W-League. Steph Catley, the game's only goalscorer, was awarded player of the match.

Teams

Route to the final

Match details

Match statistics

See also
 List of W-League champions

References

Grand final
Soccer in Melbourne
A-League Women Grand Finals
W-League